Bahadori is a surname. Notable people with the surname include:

 Benyamin Bahadori, Iranian musician
 Davoud Bahadori (born 1994), Iranian football player
 Ghodrat Bahadori (born 1990), Iranian futsal player and coach
 Hadi Bahadori (born 1978), Iranian politician
 Mehdi Bahadori (born 1933), Iranian academic and engineer
 Moslem Bahadori (1927–2022), Iranian medical scientist

Surnames of Iranian origin